Hamed Komaily (born 5 July 1982) is an Iranian actor. He is best known for his role in Eve's Daughter, Adam's Son (2010).

Career
He graduated with a bachelors of business administration and as a computer technician. He has been acting in theater for 10 years. He started his first play, in Isfahan (Iran).

He was nominated for (Tardid _ varojh karim masihi) in the International Fajr Film festival.

Filmography

Film

Web

Television

See also
Iranian cinema

References

External links

Iranian male film actors
Actors from Isfahan
1982 births
Living people